Robert Strahan (born 21 March 1838) was an American sailor who received the Medal of Honor for valor in action during the American Civil War.

Biography
Strahan was born on 21 March 1838 in New Jersey. He was awarded his Medal of Honor for gallantry under fire exhibited while crewing the ship's Number 1 gun.

Medal of Honor citation
Rank and organization: Captain of the Top, U.S. Navy. Birth: New Jersey. G.O. No.: 45, December 31, 1864. Accredited to: New Jersey.

Citation:

Served as captain of the top on board the U.S.S. Kearsarge when she destroyed the Alabama off Cherbourg, France, 19 June 1864. Acting as captain of the No. 1 gun, Strahan carried out his duties in the face of heavy enemy fire and exhibited marked coolness and good conduct throughout the engagement. Strahan was highly recommended by his division officer for his gallantry and meritorious achievements.

See also

List of American Civil War Medal of Honor recipients: Q–S

References

1838 births
Union Navy sailors
United States Navy Medal of Honor recipients
People of New Jersey in the American Civil War
Year of death unknown
American Civil War recipients of the Medal of Honor